Konec agenta W4C prostřednictvím psa pana Foustky is a 1967 Czechoslovak film parodying the James Bond secret agent genre. Directed by Václav Vorlíček based on the story by Oldřich Daněk. Runtime 87 min. Mono. Produced by Filmové Studio Barrandov and distributed by Central Office of Film Distribution, Prague.

Produced by Věra Kadlecová. Composer - Svatopluk Havelka, musical director - František Belfín. Cinematography by František Uldrich. Editor - Jaromír Janáček.

Film had a great success in USSR theatrical distribution of the 1960s.

Plot summary 
It's a spy films parody, specially James Bond movies.
Main hero - Cyril Juan Borguette alias W4C is superspy. Equipped by last invention - Alarm clock (with knife, gun, gas, geiger-muller, microphone-jammer and small atombomb - all inside) is he sent in Prague. There is saltbox with plans of military use  of Venus. Agent must play with international spy network. And on his steps is going accountant Foustka.

Cast
 Jan Kačer as Cyril Juan (Agent W4C)
 Květa Fialová as Alice
 Jiří Sovák as Foustka
 Jan Libíček as Resident
 Jiří Pleskot as Chief
 Jiří Lír as Stern
 Josef Hlinomaz as Agent 1
 Walter Taub as Big Chief
 Otto Šimánek as Inventor
 Zdeněk Braunschläger as Agent 2
 Ivo Gubel as Agent 3
 Alena Kreuzmannová
 Lubomír Kostelka
 František Husák
 Petr Čepek
 Vlastimil Hašek
 Jaroslav Kepka
 Svatopluk Skládal
 Antonin Sura
 Oldřich Velen
 Isabela Tylinkova
 Zdenek Blazek
 Vera Bauerova
 Jan Cmíral
 Jaroslav Cmíral
 Jaroslav Heyduk
 Oldřich Hoblik
 Václav Kotva
 Helena Růžičková
 Miloš Vavruška
 Hana Talpová

References

External links

1967 films
Czechoslovak black-and-white films
1960s Czech-language films
Films directed by Václav Vorlíček
1960s spy comedy films
Films set in Prague
Czech comedy films
Czech spy films
1967 comedy films
Parody films based on James Bond films
Czech parody films